Saint-Germain-près-Herment (literally Saint-Germain near Herment) is a commune in the Puy-de-Dôme department in Auvergne in central France.

Geography
The Chavanon forms part of the commune's south-western border.

See also
 Communes of the Puy-de-Dôme department

References

Saintgermainpresherment